Šućro "Šeki" Turković (born 27 November 1953) is a Serbian pop-folk singer, popular in the former Yugoslavia, Bosnia and Herzegovina and in Croatia. He has been singing since the 1980s.  

He was born in Sjenica in southwestern Serbia. Šućro performs under the stage name Šeki. He and his family moved to Novi Pazar in 1973. In 1976, Šeki and his cousin Munid moved to Belgrade. A short time after Šeki moved to Belgrade, he and his cousin went around to bars and clubs and started to sing. The manager at one of the clubs heard him soon and soon after offered Šeki an audition and a chance to sing, which turned into his life career. Šeki served his mandatory Yugoslav People's Army military service, first in Varaždin, then later on in Podravska Slatina, Croatia. 

Some of his biggest hits include: "Spomenar", "Poslednji boem", "Da du mmini22" and many more. He has collaborated on many songs with accordionist Buca Jovanović. Šeki currently lives in the United States. Šeki has a daughter, Alma, and a grandson, Admin.

Discography 
 Dok sam te voleo (1982)
 Ostanimo prijatelji (1983)
 Neobična (1985)
 Žao mi jJE(1986)
 Srećo moja još neprežaljena (1987)
 Ko je kprivacy(1988)
 Čovek sa srca dva (1989)
 Stani čoveče stani (1990)
 Ljubav je tvoje ime (1991)
 Nisam ti rekao sve (1992)
 U vinu je istina (1993)
 Evo me ljudi (1994)
 Dolaze bolja vremena (1995)
 Ja sam momak za devojke sve (1996)
 Proklela me proklela (1997)
 Taj sam brate (1998)
 Čovek dobre duše (1999)
 Molićeš za oproštaj (2000)
 Ništa nije slučajno (2001)
 Uspori živote (2002)
 Živim (2004)
 Geni (2005)
 Unikat (2006)
 Neka ti nebo sudi (2008)
 Muške suze (2013)

References

Living people
1953 births
People from Sjenica
Serbian folk singers
Serbian turbo-folk singers
Grand Production artists
Bosniaks of Serbia